Hoolehua (also spelled Hoolehua) is an unincorporated community on the island of Molokai in Maui County, Hawaii, United States.  It lies just off Hawaii Route 460, next to the Molokai Airport.  Its elevation is 620 feet (189 m).  Because the community's name has been spelled multiple ways, the Board on Geographic Names officially designated it "Hoolehua" in 2003.

Hoolehua has a post office with the ZIP code 96729. Since 1991 the post office's Post-a-Nut program provides free coconuts to mail; a sender writes the destination address on the shell, and pays for postage. About 3000 coconuts are mailed around the world
each year.

References

Unincorporated communities in Maui County, Hawaii
Populated places on Molokai
Unincorporated communities in Hawaii